The K-class was a class of 2-8-4T steam locomotives of the Western Australian Government Railways

History
Between October 1893 and August 1898, the WAGR took delivery of 24 K class locomotives from Neilson & Co. They entered service on the Eastern Railway between Midland Junction and Northam. In 1902, they were displaced from this work by the F class. They then mainly operated freight services on the Collie line and within Perth, although they did operate Royal Perth Show and raceday special passenger services.

In 1915, two were repowered with superheated boilers. A further three followed, but all were converted back by 1937. Further reboilerings increased power output by a quarter.

Six examples originally intended for the WAGR were purchased by the British Government and sent to South Africa to ease a shortage being encountered by the Imperial Military Railways as a result of the Boer War where they became the C class.

Class lists
The numbers and periods in service of each member of the K class were as follows:

Namesakes
The K class designation was previously used by the K class that was reclassified as the L class. It was reused in the 1960s when the K class diesel locomotives entered service.

See also

Rail transport in Western Australia
List of Western Australian locomotive classes

References

Notes

Cited works

External links

Neilson locomotives
Neilson Reid locomotives
Railway locomotives introduced in 1893
K WAGR class (1893)
2-8-4T locomotives
3 ft 6 in gauge locomotives of Australia